TI1 may refer to:
 The International 2011, a Dota 2 tournament
 Twilight Imperium (First Edition), a 1997 board game